Metropolis Ltd was an American game company that produced role-playing games and game supplements.

History
After leaving Iron Crown Enterprises full-time in 1992, Terry K. Amthor co-founded Metropolis Ltd. in order to produce the English-language version of the controversial Swedish modern-horror game Kult. In 1992–1994, Amthor edited, co-authored and art-directed several books for the line.

References

Role-playing game publishing companies